FC Zirka Kropyvnytskyi is a Ukrainian amateur football club from Kropyvnytskyi, Kirovohrad Oblast, with its team currently playing in the Ukrainian Amateur League.

The club traces its history of a football team that existed at the British factory of Elvorti (Elworthy) since 1911. After the occupation of Ukraine by Bolsheviks, the factory was "nationalized", its team was dissolved, and the factory was converted into Soviet factory "Chervona Zirka", hence the club's name. The Soviet football team Chervona Zirka was formed in 1922. The club's professional football history however started in 1958 when it was admitted to the Class B competitions.

History

The club traces its history back to the former Russian sports club Elvorti Yelizavetgrad that was founded in 1911 at the Elvorti Factory. The factory was later nationalized with establishment of the Soviet power and changed its name to "Chervona Zirka" (Red Star). After start of World War I and the Ukrainian-Soviet War, most sports events in the region were suspended and in 1917 the club dissolved. Sports competitions were resumed in Lyzavetghrad in 1921 that saw participation of a team.

In 1922, based on the former sports club Elvorti Yelizavetgrad were created two Soviet clubs Chervona Zirka and Chervony Profintern that participated in Soviet competition. Some of Zirka's club shields contain 1922 as the club's year of establishment. In 1928 Chervona Zirka changed its name to Metallist Zinovyevsk (Metalist Zinovyivsk) and in 1934 – Selmash Kirovo (Silmash Kirove). During the World War II the team was dissolved once again. 

It was not revived until 1948 when by being a member of the former Volunteer Sports Society Selmash, it was reorganised as Traktor Kirovograd (Traktor Kirovohrad) and after 1953 – Torpedo. 

In first post-War years 1946–47 Kirovograd (Kirovohrad) was represented in football competitions by a law enforcement team "Dynamo".

In 1958, the club was renamed into Zvezda Kirovograd (Zirka Kirovohrad) when it advanced to the professional level of Soviet competitions, the B Class. As Zirka the club existed until 2006 when it went bankrupt. In 1962 the club temporarily did not participate in Soviet competitions and Kirovohrad was once again represented by Dynamo. From 1993 to 1997 the club carried a name of its title sponsor NIBAS as Zirka-NIBAS. In 2007 the club was revived in amateur regional competitions. On July 15, 2008 the Professional Football League of Ukraine approved exchange names between Zirka and another club from Kirovohrad, FC Olimpik Kirovohrad, that competed at professional level to yield its place in the Ukrainian Second League.

Previously, Zirka debuted at a top level for the 1994–95 season, where they finished 6th. In the 1999–2000 season they finished in last place and were relegated to the Ukrainian First League. They were promoted immediately as champions once again for the 2003–04 season, but finished in last place and were demoted again.

In July 2016, the name of Zirka's hometown was renamed to Kropyvnytskyi. The next day the club announced it had changed its name to FC Zirka Kropyvnytskyi and its logo accordingly.

Team names and crest

{|class="wikitable"
|-bgcolor="#efefef"
|Year
|Name
|Meaning
|-
|1922–27
|Chervona Zirka
|Red Star
|-
|1928–35
|Metalist
|Steeler
|-
|1935–40
|Silmash
|portmanteau for Mechanised agriculture
|-
|1941–45
|club was dissolved due to the World War II
|
|-
|1946–52
|Traktor
|Tractor
|-
|1953–57
|Torpedo
|
|-
|1958–61
|Zirka
|Star
|-
|1962
|Dynamo
|
|-
|1963–93
|Zirka
|Star
|-
|1993–97
|Zirka NIBAS
|Star [NIBAS]
|-
|1998–present
|Zirka
|Star
|}

Crest

Current club's crest (logo) was adopted in 2012. In 2016 as part of decommunisation process, the club changed its city's name and year of establishment claiming its heritage of the previously existing team of British factory "Elvorti".

In 2008-2011 the club's crest contained the Red Star (the club's former name and the name of factory which owned the club) and most of elements of coat of arms of the city of Kropyvnytskyi.

Owners (sponsors)
 1911–1993: Elvorti factory (Chervona Zirka), Kirovohrad
 1993–1998: Agrarian company Nibas, Petropavlivka (Dnipropetrovsk Oblast)
 1998–2011: City authorities, Kirovohrad
 2011–present: Creative Industrial Group, Kropyvnytskyi

Current squad

Out on loan

Coaches and administration

Honors
 Cup of the Ukrainian SSR 
Winner (3): 1953, 1973, 1975
 Ukrainian First League
Winner (3): 1995, 2003, 2016
 Ukrainian Second League
Winner (1): 2009

Football kits and sponsors

League and cup history
Soviet competitions
The republican football competitions in Ukraine during the Soviet period is poorly documented, so there is little information available about the Zirka's competition record before 1958.

Ukrainian competitions

Soviet Union
{|class="wikitable" style="font-size:90%; text-align: center;"
|-bgcolor="#efefef"
! Season
! Div.
! Pos.
! Pl.
! W
! D
! L
! GS
! GA
! P
!Domestic Cup
!colspan=2|Europe
!Notes
|- bgcolor="PowderBlue"
|1971
|
|6 (26)
|50
|21
|17
|12
|52
|33
|59
|
|
|
|
|- bgcolor="PowderBlue"
|1972
|
|14 (24)
|46
|13
|18
|15
|40
|51
|44
|1/16 final Cup of Ukrainian SSR
|
|
|
|- bgcolor="PowderBlue"
|1973
|
|12 (23)
|44
|16
|10
|18
|63
|57
|36
|Winner Cup of Ukrainian SSR
|
|
|
|- bgcolor="PowderBlue"
|1974
|
|17 (20)
|38
|11
|9
|18
|34
|46
|31
|1/16 final Cup of Ukrainian SSR
|
|
|
|- bgcolor="PowderBlue"
|1975
|
|5 (17)
|32
|13
|10
|9
|37
|22
|36
|Winner Cup of Ukrainian SSR
|
|
|
|- bgcolor="PowderBlue"
|1976
|
|7 (20)
|38
|18
|6
|14
|42
|34
|42
|1/4 final Cup of Ukrainian SSR
|
|
|
|- bgcolor="PowderBlue"
|1977
|
|5 (23)
|44
|21
|15
|8
|52
|27
|57
|
|
|
|
|- bgcolor="PowderBlue"
|1978
|
|7 (23)
|44
|17
|15
|12
|42
|33
|49
|
|
|
|
|- bgcolor="PowderBlue"
|1979
|
|9 (24)
|46
|20
|10
|16
|44
|40
|50
|
|
|
|
|- bgcolor="PowderBlue"
|1980
|
|6 (23)
|44
|20
|13
|11
|52
|44
|53
|
|
|
|
|- bgcolor="PowderBlue"
|1981
|
|17 (23)
|44
|10
|19
|15
|36
|36
|39
|
|
|
|
|- bgcolor="PowderBlue"
|1982
|
|15 (24)
|46
|17
|5
|24
|43
|63
|39
|
|
|
|
|- bgcolor="PowderBlue"
| align="center" |1983
| rowspan="10" align="center" |3rd(Vtoraya Liga)
| align="center" |17 (26)
| align="center" |50
| align="center" |15
| align="center" |14
| align="center" |21
| align="center" |48
| align="center" |56
| align="center" |44
| align="center" |
| align="center" |
| align="center" |
| align="center" |
|- bgcolor="PowderBlue"
| rowspan="2" align="center" |1984
| align="center" |8 (13)
| align="center" |24
| align="center" |8
| align="center" |7
| align="center" |9
| align="center" |31
| align="center" |29
| align="center" |23
| rowspan="2" align="center" |
| rowspan="2" align="center" |
| rowspan="2" align="center" |
| align="center" |
|- bgcolor="PowderBlue"
| align="center" |18 (26)
| align="center" |14
| align="center" |5
| align="center" |4
| align="center" |5
| align="center" |23
| align="center" |20
| align="center" |14
| align="center" |
|- bgcolor="PowderBlue"
| rowspan="2" align="center" |1985
| align="center" bgcolor="silver" |2 (14)
| align="center" |26
| align="center" |12
| align="center" |7
| align="center" |7
| align="center" |35
| align="center" |27
| align="center" |31
| rowspan="2" align="center" |
| rowspan="2" align="center" |
| rowspan="2" align="center" |
| align="center" |
|- bgcolor="PowderBlue"
| align="center" |10 (28)
| align="center" |14
| align="center" |5
| align="center" |1
| align="center" |8
| align="center" |21
| align="center" |33
| align="center" |11
| align="center" |
|- bgcolor="PowderBlue"
| rowspan="2" align="center" |1986
| align="center" |10 (14)
| align="center" |26
| align="center" |9
| align="center" |4
| align="center" |13
| align="center" |28
| align="center" |51
| align="center" |22
| rowspan="2" align="center" |
| rowspan="2" align="center" |
| rowspan="2" align="center" |
| align="center" |
|- bgcolor="PowderBlue"
| align="center" |21 (28)
| align="center" |14
| align="center" |7
| align="center" |1
| align="center" |6
| align="center" |20
| align="center" |28
| align="center" |15
| align="center" |
|- bgcolor="PowderBlue"
| align="center" |1987
| align="center" |23 (27)
| align="center" |52
| align="center" |13
| align="center" |13
| align="center" |26
| align="center" |44
| align="center" |77
| align="center" |39
| align="center" |
| align="center" |
| align="center" |
| align="center" |
|- bgcolor="PowderBlue"
| align="center" |1988
| align="center" |23 (26)
| align="center" |50
| align="center" |13
| align="center" |15
| align="center" |22
| align="center" |39
| align="center" |60
| align="center" |41
| align="center" |
| align="center" |
| align="center" |
| align="center" |
|- bgcolor="PowderBlue"
| align="center" |1989
| align="center" |14 (27)
| align="center" |52
| align="center" |16
| align="center" |17
| align="center" |19
| align="center" |44
| align="center" |52
| align="center" |49
| align="center" |
| align="center" |
| align="center" |
| align="center" |
|- bgcolor="PowderBlue"
| align="center" |1990
| rowspan="2" align="center" |4th(Vtoraya Nizshaya Liga)
| align="center" |19 (19)
| align="center" |36
| align="center" |7
| align="center" |7
| align="center" |22
| align="center" |32
| align="center" |61
| align="center" |21
| align="center" |1/8 final Cup of Ukrainian SSR
| align="center" |
| align="center" |
| align="center" bgcolor="red" |Relegated
|- bgcolor="PowderBlue"
| align="center" |1991
| align="center" |25 (26)
| align="center" |50
| align="center" |12
| align="center" |13
| align="center" |25
| align="center" |55
| align="center" |90
| align="center" |37
| align="center" |1/4 final Cup of Ukrainian SSR
| align="center" |
| align="center" |
| align="center" |admitted to Ukrainian Second League
|}

Ukraine (1992-2007)
{|class="wikitable" style="font-size:90%; text-align: center;"
|-bgcolor="#efefef"
! Season
! Div.
! Pos.
! Pl.
! W
! D
! L
! GS
! GA
! P
!Domestic Cup
!colspan=2|Europe
!Notes
|-bgcolor=PowderBlue
|align=center|1992
|align=center rowspan=3|3rd(Druha Liha)
|align=center|4
|align=center|16
|align=center|8
|align=center|3
|align=center|5
|align=center|35
|align=center|24
|align=center|19
|align=center|Did not qualify
|align=center|
|align=center|
|align=center|
|-bgcolor=PowderBlue
|align=center|1992–93
|align=center|4
|align=center|34
|align=center|16
|align=center|9
|align=center|9
|align=center|50
|align=center|33
|align=center|41
|align=center| finals
|align=center|
|align=center|
|align=center|
|-bgcolor=PowderBlue
|align=center|1993–94
|align=center bgcolor=tan|3
|align=center|42
|align=center|25
|align=center|7
|align=center|10
|align=center|60
|align=center|41
|align=center|57
|align=center| finals
|align=center|
|align=center|
|align=center bgcolor=lightgreen|Promoted
|-bgcolor=LightCyan
|align=center|1994–95
|align=center|2nd(Persha Liha)
|align=center bgcolor=gold|1
|align=center|42
|align=center|27
|align=center|10
|align=center|5
|align=center|68
|align=center|26
|align=center|91
|align=center| finals
|align=center|
|align=center|
|align=center bgcolor=lightgreen|Promoted
|-
|align=center|1995–96
|align=center rowspan=5|1st(Vyshcha Liha)
|align=center|6
|align=center|34
|align=center|14
|align=center|8
|align=center|12
|align=center|37
|align=center|33
|align=center|50
|align=center| finals
|align=center|
|align=center|
|align=center|
|-
|align=center|1996–97
|align=center|10
|align=center|30
|align=center|11
|align=center|3
|align=center|16
|align=center|31
|align=center|55
|align=center|36
|align=center| finals
|align=center|
|align=center|
|align=center|
|-
|align=center|1997–98
|align=center|11
|align=center|30
|align=center|9
|align=center|6
|align=center|15
|align=center|27
|align=center|48
|align=center|33
|align=center| finals
|align=center|
|align=center|
|align=center|
|-
|align=center|1998–99
|align=center|11
|align=center|30
|align=center|9
|align=center|7
|align=center|14
|align=center|31
|align=center|40
|align=center|34
|align=center bgcolor=tan|Semi finals
|align=center|
|align=center|
|align=center|
|-
|align=center|1999-00
|align=center|16
|align=center|30
|align=center|0
|align=center|9
|align=center|21
|align=center|16
|align=center|66
|align=center|9
|align=center bgcolor=tan|Semi finals
|align=center|
|align=center|
|align=center bgcolor=red|Relegated
|-bgcolor=LightCyan
|align=center|2000–01
|align=center rowspan=3|2nd(Persha Liha)
|align=center|15
|align=center|34
|align=center|10
|align=center|10
|align=center|14
|align=center|27
|align=center|34
|align=center|40
|align=center| finals
|align=center|
|align=center|
|align=center|
|-bgcolor=LightCyan
|align=center|2001–02
|align=center|9
|align=center|34
|align=center|11
|align=center|13
|align=center|10
|align=center|29
|align=center|28
|align=center|46
|align=center|4th round
|align=center|
|align=center|
|align=center|
|-bgcolor=LightCyan
|align=center|2002–03
|align=center bgcolor=gold|1
|align=center|34
|align=center|22
|align=center|5
|align=center|7
|align=center|45
|align=center|22
|align=center|71
|align=center| finals
|align=center|
|align=center|
|align=center bgcolor=lightgreen|Promoted
|-
|align=center|2003–04
|align=center|1st(Vyshcha Liha)
|align=center|16
|align=center|30
|align=center|3
|align=center|8
|align=center|19
|align=center|16
|align=center|43
|align=center|14
|align=center| finals
|align=center|
|align=center|
|align=center bgcolor=pink|Bankrupt
|-bgcolor=PowderBlue
|align=center|2004–05
|align=center rowspan=2|3rd "B"(Druha Liha)
|align=center|12
|align=center|26
|align=center|7
|align=center|6
|align=center|13
|align=center|29
|align=center|38
|align=center|27
|align=center| finals
|align=center|
|align=center|
|align=center|
|-bgcolor=PowderBlue
|align=center|2005–06
|align=center|9
|align=center|28
|align=center|11
|align=center|4
|align=center|13
|align=center|23
|align=center|37
|align=center|37
|align=center| finals
|align=center|
|align=center|
|align=center bgcolor=pink|Bankrupt
|-bgcolor=SteelBlue
|align=center|2007
|align=center|4th(Amatory)
|align=center|2
|align=center|8
|align=center|4
|align=center|1
|align=center|3
|align=center|12
|align=center|12
|align=center|13
|align=center|
|align=center|
|align=center|
|align=center|
|}

After 2008
{|class="wikitable" style="font-size:90%; text-align: center;"
|-bgcolor="#efefef"
! Season
! Div.
! Pos.
! Pl.
! W
! D
! L
! GS
! GA
! P
!Domestic Cup
!colspan=2|Europe
!Notes
|-bgcolor=PowderBlue
|align=center|2007–08
|align=center rowspan=2|3rd "B"(Druha Liha)
|align=center colspan=14|as FC Olimpik Kirovohrad
|-bgcolor=PowderBlue
|align=center|2008–09
|align=center bgcolor=gold|1
|align=center|34
|align=center|23
|align=center|3
|align=center|8
|align=center|56
|align=center|26
|align=center|72
|align=center| finals
|align=center|
|align=center|
|align=center bgcolor=lightgreen|Promoted
|-bgcolor=LightCyan
|align=center|2009–10
|align=center rowspan=7|2nd(Persha Liha)
|align=center|12
|align=center|34
|align=center|11
|align=center|13
|align=center|10
|align=center|38
|align=center|40
|align=center|43
|align=center| finals
|align=center|
|align=center|
|align=center|–3
|-bgcolor=LightCyan
|align=center|2010–11
|align=center|12
|align=center|34
|align=center|12
|align=center|7
|align=center|15
|align=center|43
|align=center|44
|align=center|43
|align=center| finals
|align=center|
|align=center|
|align=center|
|-bgcolor=LightCyan
|align=center|2011–12
|align=center|11
|align=center|34
|align=center|13
|align=center|5
|align=center|16
|align=center|53
|align=center|49
|align=center|44
|align=center| finals
|align=center|
|align=center|
|align=center| 
|-bgcolor=LightCyan
|align=center|2012–13
|align=center|8
|align=center|34 	
|align=center|14 	
|align=center|10 	
|align=center|10 	
|align=center|46 	
|align=center|37 	
|align=center|52
|align=center| finals
|align=center|
|align=center|
|align=center|
|-bgcolor=LightCyan
|align=center|2013–14
|align=center|6
|align=center|30
|align=center|12
|align=center|8
|align=center|10
|align=center|36
|align=center|34
|align=center|44
|align=center| finals
|align=center|
|align=center|
|align=center|
|-bgcolor=LightCyan
|align=center|2014–15
|align=center|4
|align=center|30
|align=center|14
|align=center|7
|align=center|9
|align=center|42
|align=center|27
|align=center|49
|align=center| finals
|align=center|
|align=center|
|align=center|
|-bgcolor=LightCyan
|align=center|2015–16
|align=center bgcolor=gold|1
|align=center|30 	
|align=center|20 	
|align=center|5 	
|align=center|5 	
|align=center|49 	
|align=center|22 	
|align=center|65
|align=center| finals
|align=center|
|align=center|
|align=center bgcolor=lightgreen|Promoted
|-
|align=center|2016–17
|align=center rowspan=2|1st(Premier League)
|align=center|9
|align=center|32 	
|align=center|9 	
|align=center|7 	
|align=center|16	
|align=center|29 	
|align=center|43 	
|align=center|34
|align=center| finals
|align=center|
|align=center|
|align=center|
|-
|align=center|2017–18
|align=center|10
|align=center|	32 	
|align=center|	7 	
|align=center|	10 	
|align=center|	15 	
|align=center|	22 	
|align=center|	40 	
|align=center|  31 	
|align=center| finals
|align=center|
|align=center|
|align=center bgcolor=red|Relegated
|-bgcolor=LightCyan
|align=center|2018–19
|align=center|2nd
|align=center|15
|align=center|17
|align=center|1
|align=center|1
|align=center|15
|align=center|10
|align=center|49
|align=center|4
|align=center| finals
|align=center|
|align=center|
|align=center bgcolor=pink|Withdrawn
|-bgcolor=SteelBlue
|align=center|2019–20
|align=center rowspan=3|4th(Amateur)
|align=center|6
|align=center|18
|align=center|9
|align=center|3
|align=center|6
|align=center|30
|align=center|19
|align=center|30
|align=center|Did not qualify
|align=center|
|align=center|
|align=center|
|-bgcolor=SteelBlue
|align=center|2020–21
|align=center|12
|align=center|22
|align=center|0
|align=center|0
|align=center|22
|align=center|9
|align=center|86
|align=center|0
|align=center|Did not qualify
|align=center|
|align=center|
|align=center|
|-bgcolor=SteelBlue
|align=center|2021–22
|align=center|8th
|align=center|
|align=center|
|align=center|
|align=center|
|align=center|
|align=center|
|align=center|
|align=center|Did not qualify
|align=center|
|align=center|
|align=center|
|}

Notes

External links

Official Club website

 
Amateur football clubs in Ukraine
Association football clubs established in 1911
1911 establishments in Ukraine 
Sport in Kropyvnytskyi
Football clubs in the Ukrainian Soviet Socialist Republic
Football clubs in Kirovohrad Oblast
Manufacturing association football clubs in Ukraine